Rose Hall may refer to:

Rose Hall, New York City, a concert hall as part of Jazz at Lincoln Center.
Rose Hall, Guyana, a town in Guyana
Rose Hall, Saint Vincent and the Grenadines, a village in Saint Vincent and the Grenadines
Rose Hall, Oxford, a historic building, now part of St Peter's College, Oxford
Rose Hall, Montego Bay, the great house of the Rose Hall Plantation near Montego Bay, Jamaica, a tourist destination and setting of the legend of the White Witch of Rose Hall
Rose Hall Beach, Jamaica

Architectural disambiguation pages